Ralph Raymond Loffmark (February 22, 1920 – July 7, 2012) was a lawyer, chartered accountant, educator and political figure in British Columbia. He represented Vancouver-Point Grey from 1963 to 1966 and Vancouver South from 1966 to 1972 in the Legislative Assembly of British Columbia as a Social Credit member.

Biography 
He was born in Chase, British Columbia, the son of Raymond Victor Loffmark and Hazel M. Woodland, and was educated at the University of Toronto, the University of Pennsylvania and the University of British Columbia. Loffmark served in the Canadian Army during World War II. In 1961, he married Barbara Helen Grierson. He was a member of the Ontario bar and the British Columbia bar. He also was a professor at the University of British Columbia. Loffmark served in the provincial cabinet as Minister of Industrial Development, Trade and Commerce and Minister of Health. He was defeated when he ran for reelection to the provincial assembly in 1972. After leaving politics, Loffmark returned to teaching at the University of British Columbia. He openly supported the provincial New Democrats during the 1979 election and complained after his pension as a former member of the assembly was cut later that same year.

References

External links 
 

1920 births
2012 deaths
Canadian military personnel from British Columbia
British Columbia Social Credit Party MLAs
Canadian Army officers
Canadian Army personnel of World War II
Health ministers of British Columbia
Lawyers in British Columbia
Lawyers in Ontario
Members of the Executive Council of British Columbia
People from the Thompson-Nicola Regional District
University of British Columbia alumni
Academic staff of the University of British Columbia
University of Toronto alumni
University of Pennsylvania alumni
20th-century Canadian politicians
20th-century Canadian non-fiction writers
20th-century Canadian male writers
Canadian male non-fiction writers
Canadian expatriates in the United States